Hinduism in South India refers to the Hindu culture of the people of South India. Hinduism in South India is characterized by Dravidian customs and traditions, hence it is also called Dravidian Hinduism. The Dravidians made great contributions to the development of Hinduism. South India was the birthplace of many Hindu saints and reformers. The Brahmins (Hindu priests class) of ancient Dakshinapatha (Tamilakam, Telangana, Karnataka including Maharashtra and Gujarat) were classified as Pancha-Dravida (The Five Dravidians). The Hindus in South India are followers of various Hindu branches such as Shaivism, Vaishnavism, Shaktism, Brahmanism and others. Hinduism was the state religion of most of the South Indian kingdoms. During the Ancient and Middle Ages were built in South India one of the greatest Hindu temples. South Indian kings such as the Cholas spread Hinduism overseas to parts of Southeast Asia. The activities of South India across the Palk Strait led to survival of Hinduism in Sri Lanka. The Tamil. Some Hindu festivals are celebrated mostly or exclusively in South India and Sri Lanka. In South India are also numerous Hindu pilgrimage site that is visited annually by thousands of devotees. The Cauvery River that flows through Karnataka and Tamil Nadu is also known as the "Ganges of South" and is one of the most sacred river of the Hindus.

Hinduism in Ancient South India 

The Vedic culture in South India has been in some respects the best preserved of ancient Vedic culture and traditions. In North India during late ancient and medieval periods, Buddhism, Sikhism and Islam flourished alongside the Hindu majority. Every intermixing influenced North Indian culture, in particular Islam. The influence of Islam, specifically Sufism, and Sikhism are widespread in the modern-day North Indian society, clearly palpable in linguistics, music, attire, etc. Much of this influence can be attributed to close to a millennium of Muslim rule across North India. Unlike in the North, South India had less outside influence until the advent of European imperialists. As such, the original Hindu traditions are relatively better preserved in South India than in North India.

Tamil literature and Tamil epics and classics have many references to Vedic gods and culture. The Tolkaappiyam, 1st century BCE grammar book, mentions non-Vedic, early-Vedic (Indra, Varuna) and Puranic (Vishnu) gods. The Paripadal (8; 3; 9 etc.), one of the "Eight Anthologies" of poetry (or ettuttokai), has homages to Vishnu, Lakshmi, Brahma, the twelve Adityas, the Ashvins, the Rudras, the Saptarishis, Indra, the Devas etc. The Kural, written by Tiruvalluvar, mentions gods like Indra (25) and Lakshmi (e.g. 167).

The Sangam Tamil epic Silappathikaram, begins with invocations to Chandra, Surya, and Indra, and has homages to Agni, Varuna, Shiva, Subrahmanya, Vishnu-Krishna, Uma, etc. The epic states that "Vedic sacrifices [are] being faultlessly performed" and has many references to Vedic culture and Vedic texts. In the Buddhist work Manimekhalai, the submersion of the city Puhar in Kumari Kandam is attributed to the neglect of the worship to Indra.

Vedic legends
According to the Puranas, the Pandyas, Cholas and Keralas are descendants of the Vedic Turvasha people. According to the Matsya Purana, Manu is considered as a south Indian king. In Hindu tradition the creation of the Tamil language is credited to the Rig Vedic sage Rishi Agastya.

See also
Hinduism in Tamil Nadu
Hinduism in Kerala
Hinduism in Karnataka
Hinduism in Andhra Pradesh

References

Bibliography

External links

 

 
Hinduism by location